The Todd House, also known as the Todd-Biscoe House, is a historic house in Plantersville, Dallas County, Alabama.  The -story Carpenter Gothic cottage was built from 1867 to 1868 for Dr. Samuel G. Todd, the first dentist in Plantersville.  Carpenter Gothic houses are relatively rare in Alabama.  Architectural historians consider this example to be a good representation of the house designs advocated by Richard Upjohn and Alexander Jackson Davis.

The Todd family sold the property in 1916 to Salliegeo D. Lawrence.  Henry E. Biscoe purchased it from the Lawrence family in 1959.  It was added to National Register of Historic Places on January 29, 1987, as a part of the Plantersville Multiple Resource Area.

References

National Register of Historic Places in Dallas County, Alabama
Houses on the National Register of Historic Places in Alabama
Carpenter Gothic architecture in Alabama
Houses in Dallas County, Alabama
Houses completed in 1868
Carpenter Gothic houses in the United States